The 2018 Egypt Cup Final was the final match of the 2017–18 Egypt Cup and the 86th final of the Egypt Cup, Africa's oldest football cup competition. It was held at Borg El Arab Stadium in Alexandria, Egypt. It was played on 15 May 2018 between Smouha and Zamalek. It was a repeat of the 2014 final, which Zamalek won 1–0. Zamalek won the rematch 5–4 on penalties following a 1–1 tie after extra time, so qualified for the 2018–19 CAF Confederation Cup. They also earned a shot at 2017–18 Egyptian Premier League champions Al Ahly for the 2018 Egyptian Super Cup.

Smouha's route
In all results below, the score of the finalist is given first.

Smouha as an Egyptian Premier League team entered in the round of 32 of the Egypt Cup against Egyptian Second Division club Olympic Club on 10 November 2017 at Haras El Hodoud Stadium and won 2–1, with goals from Yasser Ibrahim in the 20th minute, an equalizer from Osama Marey in the 80th minute and the winner from Abdel Aziz Emam in the stoppage time. In the round of 16, they met fellow Premier League opposition Petrojet on 8 December 2017 at Al Salam Stadium, and won 2–1 with goals from Tarek Taha in the 29th minute, an equalizer from Mostafa Shebeita 4 minutes later and the winner from Hossam Hassan in the 43rd minute. In the quarter-finals, they played against Wadi Degla on 1 May 2018 at Al Salam Stadium. There was no real chances in the match for both teams, except one powerful shot from Oumed Oukri in the 96th minute that almost sent Smouha straight to semi-finals, but El Sayed Salem managed to clear the ball from the goal line. The match ended 0–0 after extra time, and Smouha won 3–1 on penalties. In the semi-finals, Smouha faced Al Assiouty Sport on 8 May 2018 at Borg El Arab Stadium. Smouha played against their future new manager Ali Maher, who signed a contract with the club to lead the team after the 2017–18 season ends. Smouha won the match 4–3 on penalties after the match ended 1–1 after extra time. Ahmed Temsah scored the opener for Smouha in the 72nd minute before Benson Shilongo took the game to extra time after tying up the match by scoring a penalty in the stoppage time. Smouha are seeking their first ever Egypt Cup triumph.

Match details

References

Egypt Cup Finals
2017–18 Egypt Cup
2017–18 in Egyptian football
Smouha SC matches
Zamalek SC matches
Egypt Cup Final 2018